Gnaphosa sericata is a species of ground spider in the family Gnaphosidae. It is found in a range from the United States to Guatemala and Cuba.

References

External links

 

Gnaphosidae
Articles created by Qbugbot
Spiders described in 1866